A notification service provides means to send a notice to many persons at once.  For example, if a flood were likely, residents of a community could be warned it's time to evacuate.  If a school were suddenly closed for the day, students or parents could be told not come to school, or told to report to an alternate location.  American Airlines can notify passengers by cellphone two hours before a flight's departure with information on the flight's status and gate number.

When notification services are used for emergency notification, they are often called Emergency Mass Notification Services (EMNS). 
Notification services  and emergency notification services can provide a wide range of options, including:

Notifications may be by e-mail, telephone, fax, text messages, etc.
Identical messages may be broadcast, or the messages may be personalized.
The notification service equipment may be owned by the sender, or may owned by a service provider.
A message may, or may not require a response.

See also
 Apple Push Notification Service (APNs)
 Amazon Simple Notification Service (SNS)
 Android Cloud to Device Messaging (C2DM)
 Boomerang Software Framework
 Blackboard Connect
 Firebase Cloud Messaging (FCM)
 Google Cloud Messaging (GCM)
 Message queuing service
 SQL Server Notification Services
 Windows Push Notification Service (WNS)

References

External links
Example of Emergency Mass Notification System used by University of Missouri
An example of a web-oriented notification service provider
Amazon Simple Notification Service
Google Cloud Messaging Provider
Example of Emergency Mass Notification System used by Rochester Institute of Technology 
Public services